Murabitat (defenders of the faith, steadfast, or garrison soldiers) (“Murabitin”, "Mourabitoun" (males) and “Murabitat”, "Mourabitat" (females)) is an illegal Islamist political movement of Muslim women, funded by the northern branch of the Islamic Movement in Israel. The group organises classes at Al Aqsa Mosque from learning how to read and write to university level and Islamic tajweed or the musical chanting of Quranic verses.

Following the 1967 Six-Day War, Israel left administrative oversight of the Temple Mount/al-Haram al-Shariff to Jordan, which delegates authority to the Jerusalem Islamic Waqf. Israel maintains security control. A status quo was declared where Muslims have been allowed to pray atop the compound while non-Muslims were allowed to visit unobstructed but not allowed to pray. In this context, members of Murabitat movement also keep an eye on Jews visiting the compound and who would be "attempting to pray". Women from the organisation disrupted several such attempts by shouting at the groups, cursing, and by physical assault.

History
The parallel groups, Murabiton for men and Murabitat for women, were created by the northern branch of the Islamist group, Islamic Movement in Israel in 2012.   According to Haaretz, their purpose is "to harass Jews visiting Temple Mount." The groups run a daily shuttle service between the concentration of Arab towns including Umm al-Fahm and Tayibe), that is called the Triangle, as well as from the Negev and the Galilee to the Temple Mount.

According to Israeli security officials, before the male and female groups were banned and the offices of the NGO funding them closed, activists were paid  3,000–4,000 shekels ($771–$1,028) per month, with some of the funds coming from the Gulf States.

Incidents
According to Christian Broadcasting Network, the  women are, "paid to harass female visitors to the Temple Mount even when they're modestly dressed."

In August, 2015, the women harassed a group of visiting Members of the United States Congress, including Rep. Evan Jenkins,  Rep. Trent Franks, Rep. Keith Rothfus and Mr. Jenkins' wife, Elizabeth Jenkins.   Congressman Jenkins described himself as being, "struck by the level of intolerance and the confrontational attitudes and approach and actions" taken by the group."  He described the behavior of the Muslims on the Temple Mount that day as "shocking".

Moshe Ya'alon, the Minister of Defense, has asserted that the groups' behavior leads, "to violence that could harm human life."

Declared illegal
In August 2015, the activists were banned from Temple Mount by Israeli Minister of Public Security, Gilad Erdan, during morning visiting hours. Earlier, the Arab League condemned the plan to ban the group. On September 8, 2015, Defense Minister Moshe Ya'alon signed an order which declared the Murabitat group as an illegal organization.

Sheikh Azzam al-Khatib, head of the Jerusalem Islamic Waqf that administers the Temple Mount, called the decision, "totally unacceptable", asserting that the government of Israel had "no right" to intervene.

External links 
 Who are the guardians of al-Aqsa?, 2016, Megan O'Toole, Al-Jazeera.
 Meet the outlawed women of Israel’s Islamic Movement, January 16, 2016, Samah Salaime, +972 Magazine.

References

2012 establishments in Israel
2015 disestablishments in Israel
Illegal organizations
Islamic organizations based in Israel
Islamism in Israel
Anti-Islam sentiment in Israel
Organizations promoting literacy
Political movements in Israel
Religious organizations established in 2012
Religious organizations disestablished in 2015
Temple Mount
Women's organizations based in Israel
Islamic organizations established in the 21st century